The  basketball tournament at the 1989 Southeast Asian Games took place from 21 to 25 August 1989.  This edition of the tournament featured both men's and women's tournament.  All matches took place at Stadium Negara in Kuala Lumpur.

As of 2017, Malaysia is the only other country to win the men's basketball championship as the Philippines managed to reclaim the title in the 1991 edition and haven't relinquished it since (defending the title for the 12th consecutive time).

Meanwhile, after being undefeated in the women's division, won their first ever championship, thus ending the hosts 's reign of six-time defending champions.

Tournament format
For both the men's and the women's tournament, the competition was on a round robin format, wherein the top team at the end of the single round wins the gold medal, with the next two team will take home the silver and bronze medals, respectively.

Men's tournament

Participating nations

Results

Women's tournament

Participating nations

Results

References

1989
1989 in Asian basketball
1989 in Malaysian sport
International basketball competitions hosted by Malaysia
Basketball